Parasinilabeo is a genus of cyprinid fish endemic to China.  There are currently six described species in this genus.

Species
 Parasinilabeo assimilis H. W. Wu & Yao, 1977
 Parasinilabeo longibarbus Y. Zhu, C. Lan & E. Zhang, 2006
 Parasinilabeo longicorpus E. Zhang, 2000
 Parasinilabeo longiventralis Y. F. Huang, X. Y. Chen & J. X. Yang, 2007
 Parasinilabeo maculatus E. Zhang, 2000
 Parasinilabeo microps (R. F. Su, J. X. Yang & G. H. Cui, 2001)

References
 

 
Cyprinidae genera
Cyprinid fish of Asia
Freshwater fish of China